The 2023 Middle Tennessee Blue Raiders football team will represent Middle Tennessee State University in the 2023 NCAA Division I FBS football season. The Blue Raiders will play their home games at Johnny "Red" Floyd Stadium in Murfreesboro, Tennessee, and will compete members of Conference USA. They will be led by eighteenth-year head coach Rick Stockstill.

Schedule
Middle Tennessee and Conference USA announced the 2023 football schedule on January 10, 2023.

References

Middle Tennessee
Middle Tennessee Blue Raiders football seasons
Middle Tennessee Blue Raiders football